Space Pirate Trainer is a Virtual Reality (VR) first-person shooter developed and produced by I-Illusions. It was one of the earliest wave shooters utilizing the VR game-play environment. The game was released alongside the HTC Vive and featured in VR arcades. In 2018, it was also released digitally through the PlayStation Store.

Gameplay 
The game places the player on a platform in space while waves of robots come down and attack. The player has a choice between a pistol, shotgun, laser, machine gun, grenade launcher and laser sword to fight off the robots.

Development 
The game was developed by Dirk Van Welden, inspired by his love for the eighties arcade aesthetic. Welden was skeptical of developing a game for VR since in past experiences he had experienced severe nausea using the platform. Once motion tracking had improved Welden developed a demo for a game and posted on a forum. He was then contacted by Valve and told that he should work on a fully-fledged game.

Reception 
Space Pirate Trainer received "mixed or average reviews" from critics according to Metacritic.

References

External links 

 Official Website

Virtual reality games
First-person shooters